Peblephaeus lutaoensis is a species of beetle in the family Cerambycidae. It was described by Takakuwa in 1991.

References

Lamiini
Beetles described in 1991